Stephen Conrad Stuntz (1875–1918) was an American botanist and fiction author.

Life
Graduating with a Bachelor of Science from the University of Wisconsin in 1899, Stuntz worked as an assistant at the university library and herbarium until 1902. With Laurance Charles Burke, he produced the first newsletter for the UW‑Madison libraries called The Library Item in 1900. From 1902 to 1908, he was a cataloguer with the Library of Congress, and from 1908 to 1910 he was a bibliographer with the United States Department of Agriculture's Bureau of Soils. From 1910 until his death he was a botanist with the Office of Foreign Seed and Plant Introductions. 
In June 1907, Stephen married Lena G. Fitzhugh. He died of pneumonia in 1918.

Published major works: fiction
Under his pseudonym, Stephen Conrad, he wrote two humorous fiction works; 
The Second Mrs. Jim, and 
Mrs. Jim and Mrs. Jimmie; certain town experiences of the second Mrs. Jim as related to Jimmie's wife

Published major works: non-fiction

In the field of botany, Stuntz wrote multiple descriptions of species, primarily in the Inventory of seeds and plants imported by the Office of Foreign Seed and Plant Introduction of the United States Department of Agriculture. 
He also wrote:
S.C. Stuntz. 1900. A Revision of the North American Species of the Genus Eleutera Beauv. (Neckera Hedw.) Bulletin of the Torrey Botanical Club 27(4):202–211.
E.E. Free and S.C. Stuntz. 1911.The movement of soil material by the wind, with a bibliography of eolian geology.
Posthumously, he also published: 
S.C. Stuntz, E.B. Hawks [ed.] 1941. List of the agricultural periodicals of the United States and Canada published during the century July 1810 to July 1910.

Standard author abbreviation

Botanical collections
Stuntz's bryological collections are held at the University of Wisconsin Herbarium, the New York Botanical Garden, the Field Museum of Natural History, the University of Michigan Herbarium, the University of Tennessee Bryophyte Herbarium, the Peabody Museum of Natural History, and Harvard University Herbaria. A smaller number of his vascular plant collections are held by the University of Wisconsin Herbarium, and outside of North America specimens are held by the National Herbarium of Victoria Royal Botanic Gardens Victoria.

References

1875 births
Bryologists
1918 deaths
19th-century American botanists
20th-century American botanists
University of Wisconsin alumni
People from Green County, Wisconsin
Deaths from pneumonia in Virginia
Writers from Wisconsin